Pitcairnia is a genus of plants in the family Bromeliaceae, subfamily Pitcairnioideae. It was named for William Pitcairn, Scottish physician and gardener (1711–1791). The genus Pitcairnia ranks as the second most prolific of the bromeliad family (after Tillandsia). They are most abundant in Colombia, Peru and Brazil, but can also be found in areas from Cuba and Mexico south to Argentina. One species, Pitcairnia feliciana, is found in tropical West Africa and is the only member of the family Bromeliaceae not native to the Americas.

Almost all Pitcairnias are terrestrial or saxicolous, and prefer moist areas. However, many are found growing epiphytically in trees.

Taxonomy
Pitcairnia was established as a genus by Charles Louis L'Héritier de Brutelle in 1788. In 1870, Pepinia was established as a genus by Adolphe-Théodore Brongniart in a publication by Édouard André. Pepinia was reduced to a subgenus of Pitcairnia in 1881 by John Gilbert Baker, but elevated again to a genus in 1988, largely on the basis of the morphology of its seeds. The use of morphological characters to differentiate Pepinia from Pitcairnia was rejected in 1999; a view confirmed later by multiple molecular studies.

Species
, Plants of the World Online accepted 407 species, including those formerly placed in the genus Pepinia, now treated as Pitcairnia subgenus Pepinia.
Pitcairnia abundans L.B.Sm. – Oaxaca, Nayarit
Pitcairnia abyssicola Leme & L.Kollmann – Espírito Santo
Pitcairnia acicularis L.B.Sm. – Lambayeque
Pitcairnia adscendens L.B.Sm. – Valle del Cauca
Pitcairnia aequatorialis L.B.Sm. – Ecuador
Pitcairnia agavifolia L.B.Sm., syn. Pepinia agavifolia (L.B.Sm.) G.S.Varad. & Gilmartin – State of Amazonas in Venezuela
Pitcairnia alata L.B.Sm. – Ecuador
Pitcairnia albiflos Herb. – Rio de Janeiro
Pitcairnia albifolia Cáceres Gonz. & A.Ibáñez
Pitcairnia albolutea J.R.Grant – Venezuela
Pitcairnia alborubra Baker, syn. Pepinia alborubra (Baker) G.S.Varad. & Gilmartin – Colombia, Ecuador
Pitcairnia alexanderi (H.Luther) D.C.Taylor & H.Rob. – Ecuador
Pitcairnia altensteinii (Link, Klotzsch & Otto) Lem. – Venezuela
Pitcairnia altoatratoensis G.S.Varad. & Forero – Colombia 
Pitcairnia amblyosperma L.B.Sm., syn. Pepinia amblyosperma (L.B.Sm.) G.S.Varad. & Gilmartin – San Luis Potosí, Veracruz, Puebla
Pitcairnia amboroensis Ibisch, R.Vásquez, E.Gross & M.Kessler – Bolivia
Pitcairnia anarosae Gonz.-Rocha, Mejía-Marín & Espejo
Pitcairnia ancuashii L.B.Sm. & Read – Peru
Pitcairnia andreana Linden – Colombia
Pitcairnia andreetae H.Luther – Ecuador
Pitcairnia angustifolia Aiton – Puerto Rico, Lesser Antilles
Pitcairnia anomala Hoehne, syn. Pepinia anomala (Hoehne) G.S.Varad. & Gilmartin – Mato Grosso
Pitcairnia aphelandriflora Lem., syn. Pepinia aphelandriflora (Lem.) André – Panama, Peru, Ecuador
Pitcairnia archeri L.B.Sm. – Colombia
Pitcairnia arcuata (André) André – Costa Rica, Panama, Colombia, Peru, Ecuador
Pitcairnia arenaria H.Luther – Peru
Pitcairnia arenicola L.B.Sm. – Colombia
Pitcairnia arida L.B.Sm. & Betancur – Colombia
Pitcairnia armata Maury, syn. Pepinia armata (Maury) G.S.Varad. & Gilmartin – Venezuela
Pitcairnia asplundii L.B.Sm. – Huánuco
Pitcairnia atrorubens (Beer) Baker – from Nayarit south to Colombia
Pitcairnia attenuata L.B.Sm. & Read, syn.  – Peru
Pitcairnia augusti Harms
Pitcairnia aurea Rusby ex L.B.Sm. – Bolivia 
Pitcairnia aureobrunnea Rauh – Peru
Pitcairnia azouryi Martinelli & Forzza – Espírito Santo
Pitcairnia bakeri (André) Mez – Colombia, Ecuador
Pitcairnia bakiorum Manzan. & W.Till – Ecuador
Pitcairnia barbatostigma Leme & A.P.Fontana – Espírito Santo
Pitcairnia barrigae L.B.Sm. – Colombia
Pitcairnia basincurva L.B.Sm. & Betancur – Colombia
Pitcairnia beachiae Utley & Burt-Utley, syn. Pepinia beachiae (Utley & Burt-Utley) H.Luther – Costa Rica
Pitcairnia bella L.B.Sm. – Colombia, Ecuador
Pitcairnia bergii H.Luther – Ecuador 
Pitcairnia betancurii L.B.Sm. – Colombia
Pitcairnia beycalema Beer – Rio de Janeiro
Pitcairnia bicolor L.B.Sm. & Read – Colombia
Pitcairnia bifaria L.B.Sm. – Peru
Pitcairnia biflora L.B.Sm. – Peru
Pitcairnia bifrons (Lindl.) Read – Guadeloupe, St. Kitts
Pitcairnia bifurcatispina Manzan. & W.Till – Ecuador
Pitcairnia billbergioides L.B.Sm. – Peru
Pitcairnia brachysperma André – Colombia, Ecuador
Pitcairnia brackeana Manzan. & W.Till – Ecuador 
Pitcairnia bradei Markgr., syn. Pepinia bradei (Markgraf) G.S.Varad. & Gilmartin – Minas Gerais, Brasília 
Pitcairnia breedlovei L.B.Sm. – Oaxaca, Chiapas
Pitcairnia brevicalycina Mez – Venezuela, Peru
Pitcairnia brittoniana (Mez) Mez – Costa Rica, Nicaragua, Colombia, Venezuela, Guyana, Ecuador, Peru, Bolivia 
Pitcairnia bromeliifolia L'Hér. – Jamaica
Pitcairnia brongniartiana André – Colombia, Ecuador
Pitcairnia brunnescens L.B.Sm. – Colombia, Ecuador
Pitcairnia bulbosa L.B.Sm., syn. Pepinia bulbosa (L.B.Sm.) G.S.Varad. & Gilmartin – Colombia, Venezuela
Pitcairnia burle-marxii Braga & Sucre – Espírito Santo
Pitcairnia buscalionii W.Till – State of Amazonas in Brazil
Pitcairnia caduciflora Rauh & E.Gross – Ecuador
Pitcairnia calatheoides L.B.Sm. – Peru
Pitcairnia calcicola J.R.Grant & J.F.Morales – Costa Rica
Pitcairnia calderonii Standl. & L.B.Sm. – Chiapas, Guatemala, El Salvador, Honduras
Pitcairnia calophylla L.B.Sm. – Colombia
Pitcairnia camposii H.Luther – Peru
Pitcairnia cana B.Holst – State of Amazonas in Venezuela
Pitcairnia cantuoides R.Vásquez & Ibisch – Bolivia
Pitcairnia capitata L.B.Sm. – Nariño in Colombia
Pitcairnia capixaba Fraga & Leme – Espírito Santo
Pitcairnia cardenasii L.B.Sm. – Bolivia
Pitcairnia caricifolia Mart. ex Schult. & Schult.f., syn. Pepinia caricifolia (Mart. ex Schult. & Schult.f.) G.S.Varad. & Gilmartin – Colombia, Venezuela, the Guianas, northern Brazil
Pitcairnia carinata Mez – Rio de Janeiro
Pitcairnia carioana Wittm. – Chiapas, Guatemala
Pitcairnia carnea Beer – Panama
Pitcairnia carnososepala Rauh & Gross, syn. Pepinia carnososepala (Rauh & E.Gross) H.Luther – Ecuador
Pitcairnia cassapensis Mez – Peru
Pitcairnia cataractae Manzan. & W.Till – Ecuador
Pitcairnia caulescens (K.Koch ex Mez) Mez – Venezuela
Pitcairnia cerrateana L.B.Sm. – Ancash in Peru
Pitcairnia chiapensis Miranda – Chiapas
Pitcairnia chiquitana R.Vásquez & Ibisch – Bolivia
Pitcairnia chiriguana A.Cast. – Salta in Argentina
Pitcairnia chiriquensis L.B.Sm. – Panama
Pitcairnia chocoensis L.B.Sm. – Colombia
Pitcairnia clarkii H.Luther – Ecuador
Pitcairnia clavata L.B.Sm. – Peru
Pitcairnia cofanorum Manzan. & W.Till – Ecuador
Pitcairnia colimensis L.B.Sm. – Colima, Michoacán
Pitcairnia commixta L.B.Sm. – Venezuela, Colombia, Ecuador
Pitcairnia compostelae McVaugh – Jalisco, Nayarit
Pitcairnia condorensis Manzan. & W.Till – Ecuador
Pitcairnia corallina Linden & André, syn. Pepinia corallina (Linden & André) G.S.Varad. & Gilmartin – Colombia, Peru, northern Brazil
Pitcairnia corcovadensis Wawra – Rio de Janeiro
Pitcairnia cosangaensis Gilmartin – Ecuador
Pitcairnia costata L.B.Sm., syn. Pepinia costata (L.B.Sm.) G.S.Varad. & Gilmartin – Colombia
Pitcairnia crassa L.B.Sm. – Bolivia 
Pitcairnia cremersii Gouda – Suriname, French Guiana
Pitcairnia crinita E.Pereira & Martinelli, syn. Pepinia martinellii H.Luther, nom. superfl. – Pará
Pitcairnia cristalinensis (Leme) D.C.Taylor & H.Rob., syn. Pepinia cristalinensis Leme – Goiás
Pitcairnia croatii H.Luther – Panama
Pitcairnia ctenophylla L.B.Sm., syn. Pepinia ctenophylla (L.B.Sm.) G.S.Varad. & Gilmartin – State of Bolívar in Venezuela
Pitcairnia cuatrecasasiana L.B.Sm.
Pitcairnia cubensis (Mez) L.B.Sm. – Cuba
Pitcairnia curvidens L.B.Sm. & Read – Minas Gerais
Pitcairnia cuzcoensis L.B.Sm. – Cusco in Peru
Pitcairnia cyanopetala Ule –  Peru
Pitcairnia cylindrostachya L.B.Sm. – Jalisco, Mexico State, Oaxaca, Nayarit
Pitcairnia decidua L.B.Sm. – Espírito Santo, Rio de Janeiro, Minas Gerais
Pitcairnia decurvata L.B.Sm. – Peru
Pitcairnia delicata H.Luther – Colombia
Pitcairnia dendroidea André – Colombia, Ecuador
Pitcairnia densiflora Brongn. ex Lem. – Veracruz, Guerrero
Pitcairnia deroosei Manzan. & W.Till – Ecuador
Pitcairnia devansayana André – Ecuador
Pitcairnia diffusa L.B.Sm. – Colombia, Ecuador
Pitcairnia divaricata Wittm. – Bolivia
Pitcairnia diversifolia Leme & A.P.Fontana
Pitcairnia dodsonii H.Luther – Ecuador
Pitcairnia dolichopetala Harms – Colombia, Ecuador
Pitcairnia domingensis L.B.Sm. – Dominican Republic
Pitcairnia echinata Hook. – Colombia, Venezuela
Pitcairnia egleri L.B.Sm. – Pará
Pitcairnia elizabethae L.B.Sm. – Hispaniola
Pitcairnia ellenbergii L.B.Sm. – Cusco in Peru
Pitcairnia elliptica Mez & Sodiro – Ecuador
Pitcairnia elongata L.B.Sm. – Peru, Colombia, Ecuador
Pitcairnia elvirae D.C.Taylor & H.Rob., syn. Pepinia verrucosa E.Gross – Ecuador
Pitcairnia encholirioides L.B.Sm. – Rio de Janeiro
Pitcairnia ensifolia Mez, syn. Pepinia ensifolia (Mez) G.S.Varad. & Gilmartin – Goiás
Pitcairnia epiphytica L.B.Sm., syn. Pepinia epiphytica (L.B.Sm.) G.S.Varad. & Gilmartin – State of Amazonas in Venezuela
Pitcairnia eximia Mez – Junín in Peru
Pitcairnia explosiva L.B.Sm. & Betancur – Colombia
Pitcairnia exserta L.B.Sm. – Colombia
Pitcairnia farinosa L.B.Sm. & Betancur – Colombia
Pitcairnia feliciana (A.Chev.) Harms & Mildbr. – Guinea in West Africa
Pitcairnia fendleri (Mez) Mez – Venezuela
Pitcairnia ferrell-ingramiae H.Luther & Dalström – Ecuador
Pitcairnia ferreyrae L.B.Sm. – Ucayali in Peru
Pitcairnia filifera L.B.Sm. ex H.Luther – Peru
Pitcairnia filispina L.B.Sm., syn. Pepinia filispina (L.B.Sm.) G.S.Varad. & Gilmartin – State of Amazonas in Venezuela
Pitcairnia fimbriatobracteata Rauh, syn. Pepinia fimbriatobracteata (Rauh) G.S.Varad. & Gilmartin – Peru
Pitcairnia flagellaris L.B.Sm. – Guatemala, Honduras
Pitcairnia flammea Lindl. – southeastern Brazil
Pitcairnia flavescenta Matuda
Pitcairnia flexuosa L.B.Sm. – Guatemala, El Salvador, central + southern Mexico
Pitcairnia floresii Gouda & Ric.Fernández – Peru
Pitcairnia fluvialis L.B.Sm. & Betancur – Colombia
Pitcairnia foliacea L.B.Sm. – Michoacán
Pitcairnia foreroi H.Luther & G.S.Varad. – Colombia
Pitcairnia formosa L.B.Sm. & Betancur – Colombia
Pitcairnia fosteriana L.B.Sm. – Colombia
Pitcairnia fractifolia L.B.Sm. – Peru
Pitcairnia frequens L.B.Sm. & B.Holst ex Saraiva & Forzza – State of Amazonas in Brazil
Pitcairnia fruticosa L.B.Sm. & Betancur – Colombia
Pitcairnia fuertesii Mez – Hispaniola
Pitcairnia funkiae M.A.Spencer & L.B.Sm. – Costa Rica
Pitcairnia fusca H.Luther – Ecuador
Pitcairnia gemmipara L.B.Sm. & Betancur – Colombia
Pitcairnia geotropa J.R.Grant – Panama
Pitcairnia geyskesii L.B.Sm., syn. Pepinia geyskesii (L.B.Sm.) G.S.Varad. & Gilmartin – northern Brazil, the Guianaa
Pitcairnia glauca Leme & A.P.Fontana – Espírito Santo
Pitcairnia glaziovii Baker – Rio de Janeiro
Pitcairnia glymiana K.Koch – described 1868 from material collected in Caribbean; probably extinct
Pitcairnia goudae Manzan. & W.Till – Ecuador
Pitcairnia graniticola B.Holst, syn.  – State of Bolívar in Venezuela
Pitcairnia grubbiana L.B.Sm. – Boyacá in Colombia
Pitcairnia guaritermae André – Cundinamarca in Colombia
Pitcairnia gutteana W.Weber – Peru
Pitcairnia guzmanioides L.B.Sm. – Costa Rica, Peru, Colombia
Pitcairnia halophila L.B.Sm. – Costa Rica, Panama
Pitcairnia hammelii H.Luther, syn. Pepinia hammelii (H.Luther) H.Luther – Panama
Pitcairnia harlingii L.B.Sm., syn. Pepinia harlingii (L.B.Sm.) G.S.Varad. & Gilmartin – Ecuador
Pitcairnia harrylutheri D.C.Taylor & H.Rob. – Ecuador
Pitcairnia hatschbachii E.Pereira – Goiás
Pitcairnia haughtii L.B.Sm. – Cauca in Colombia
Pitcairnia heerdeae E.Gross & Rauh – Colombia
Pitcairnia heliophila L.B.Sm., syn. Pepinia heliophila (L.B.Sm.) G.S.Varad. & Gilmartin – Colombia
Pitcairnia heterophylla (Lindl.) Beer – Peru, Ecuador, Colombia, Venezuela, Central America, central + southern Mexico
Pitcairnia heydlauffii R.Vásquez & Ibisch – Bolivia
Pitcairnia hintoniana L.B.Sm. – México State, Guerrero
Pitcairnia hirtzii H.Luther – Ecuador
Pitcairnia hitchcockiana L.B.Sm. – Venezuela, Ecuador
Pitcairnia holstii (H.Luther) J.R.Grant – Peru
Pitcairnia hooveri (H.Luther) D.C.Taylor & H.Rob., syn. Pepinia hooveri H.Luther – Ecuador
Pitcairnia huilensis Betancur & Jiménez-Esc.
Pitcairnia imbricata (Brongn.) Regel – Central America, central + southern Mexico
Pitcairnia inaequalis W.Weber, syn.  – Brazil; probably extinct
Pitcairnia inermis (E.Mey. ex C.Presl) E.Mey. ex Schult. & Schult.f. – Peru, Bolivia
Pitcairnia insularis Tatagiba & R.J.V.Alves – Rio de Janeiro
Pitcairnia integrifolia Ker Gawl. – Trinidad, Venezuela, Brazil
Pitcairnia irwiniana L.B.Sm. – Goiás
Pitcairnia jaramilloi G.S.Varad. & Forero – Colombia
Pitcairnia jareckii Proctor & Cedeño-Mald. – British Virgin Islands
Pitcairnia jimenezii L.B.Sm. – Dominican Republic
Pitcairnia johannis L.B.Sm. – Santander in Colombia
Pitcairnia juncoides L.B.Sm., syn. Pepinia juncoides (L.B.Sm.) G.S.Varad. & Gilmartin
Pitcairnia juzepczukii W.Weber – Junín in Peru
Pitcairnia kalbreyeri Baker – Costa Rica, Colombia, Panama
Pitcairnia karwinskyana Schult. & Schult.f. – central Mexico from Zacatecas to Guerrero
Pitcairnia killipiana L.B.Sm., syn. Pepinia killipiana (L.B.Sm.) G.S.Varad. & Gilmartin – Colombia
Pitcairnia kirkbridei L.B.Sm. & Read – Pará
Pitcairnia kniphofioides L.B.Sm. – Colombia
Pitcairnia koeneniana E.Gross & Barthlott – Nayarit
Pitcairnia kressii H.Luther – Panama
Pitcairnia kroemeri H.Luther – Bolivia
Pitcairnia kunhardtiana L.B.Sm., syn. Pepinia kunhardtiana (L.B.Sm.) G.S.Varad. & Gilmartin – State of Amazonas in Venezuela
Pitcairnia lanuginosa Ruiz & Pav. – Peru, Bolivia, Brazil
Pitcairnia laxissima Baker – Cauca in Colombia
Pitcairnia lechleri Baker – Peru
Pitcairnia lehmannii Baker – Peru, Ecuador, Colombia
Pitcairnia leopoldii (W.Till & S.Till) B.Holst, syn. Pepinia leopoldii W.Till & S.Till – State of Amazonas in Venezuela
Pitcairnia lepidopetalon L.B.Sm. – Nariño in Colombia
Pitcairnia leprosa L.B.Sm. – Guerrero
Pitcairnia lignosa L.B.Sm. – Colombia
Pitcairnia limae L.B.Sm., syn. Pepinia limae (L.B.Sm.) G.S.Varad. & Gilmartin – Ceará
Pitcairnia lindae Betancur – Colombia
Pitcairnia loki-schmidtiae Rauh & Barthlott – Jalisco
Pitcairnia longipes Mez – Cauca in Colombia
Pitcairnia longissimiflora Ibisch, R.Vásquez & E.Gross – Bolivia
Pitcairnia lopezii L.B.Sm. – La Libertad in Peru
Pitcairnia luschnathii W.Weber, syn.  – Brazil; probably extinct
Pitcairnia lutescens Mez & Sodiro – Ecuador
Pitcairnia luteyniorum L B Sm. & Read, syn. Pepinia luteyniorum (L.B.Sm. & Read) G.S.Varad. & Gilmartin
Pitcairnia lutheri Manzan. & W.Till – Ecuador
Pitcairnia lymansmithiana H.Luther
Pitcairnia macarenensis L.B.Sm. – Colombia 
Pitcairnia macranthera André – Colombia, Ecuador
Pitcairnia macrobotrys André – Colombia 
Pitcairnia maguirei L.B.Sm., syn. Pepinia maguirei (L.B.Sm.) G.S.Varad. & Gilmartin – State of Amazonas in Venezuela
Pitcairnia maidifolia (C.Morren) Decne. ex Planch. – Suriname, Guyana, Venezuela, Colombia, Ecuador, Central America
Pitcairnia marinii Manzan. & W.Till – Ecuador
Pitcairnia maritima L.B.Sm. – Colombia 
Pitcairnia marnier-lapostollei L.B.Sm. – Peru
Pitcairnia matogrossensis E.Pereira & Leme – Mato Grosso
Pitcairnia matudae L.B.Sm. – Chiapas
Pitcairnia megasepala Baker – Panama, Costa Rica, Colombia
Pitcairnia melanopoda L.B.Sm. – Peru
Pitcairnia membranifolia Baker – Costa Rica
Pitcairnia meridensis (Klotzsch ex Mez) Mez – Venezuela
Pitcairnia micheliana Andrews – Michoacán, Jalisco
Pitcairnia micotrinensis Read – Dominica, Martinique
Pitcairnia microcalyx Baker – Venezuela
Pitcairnia micropoda L.B.Sm. – México State
Pitcairnia minicorallina (H.Luther) J.R.Grant – Peru
Pitcairnia mirandae Utley & Burt-Utley – Chiapas
Pitcairnia mituensis L.B.Sm., syn. Pepinia mituensis (L.B.Sm.) G.S.Varad. & Gilmartin – Colombia 
Pitcairnia modesta L.B.Sm. – Guerrero
Pitcairnia mohammadii Ibisch & R.Vásquez – Bolivia
Pitcairnia monticola Brandegee – Sinaloa
Pitcairnia mooreana L.B.Sm. – Guerrero
Pitcairnia moritziana K.Koch & C.D.Bouché – Venezuela
Pitcairnia mucida L.B.Sm. & Read – Colombia
Pitcairnia multiflora L.B.Sm. – Panama, Colombia
Pitcairnia multiramosa (Mez) Mez – Chuquisaca
Pitcairnia neeana (L.B.Sm. ex H.Luther) J.R.Grant
Pitcairnia neglecta (H.Luther) D.C.Taylor & H.Rob., syn. Pepinia neglecta H.Luther – Peru
Pitcairnia neillii Manzan. & W.Till – Rondônia
Pitcairnia nematophora L.B.Sm. & Read – State of Amazonas in Venezuela
Pitcairnia nigra (Carrière) André – Colombia, Panama, Ecuador
Pitcairnia nobilis Mez & Sodiro – Chimborazo
Pitcairnia nortefluminensis Leme – Rio de Janeiro
Pitcairnia nubigena Planch. – Venezuela
Pitcairnia nuda Baker, syn. Pepinia nuda (Baker) G.S.Varad. & Gilmartin – Guyana, Suriname, Venezuela
Pitcairnia oaxacana L.B.Sm. – Oaxaca, Michoacán, Guerrero
Pitcairnia oblongifolia L.B.Sm. – Ecuador 
Pitcairnia occidentalis L.B.Sm., syn. Pepinia occidentalis (L.B.Sm.) G.S.Varad. & Gilmartin – Colombia
Pitcairnia odontopoda Baker – Peru, Bolivia
Pitcairnia olivaestevae J.R.Grant
Pitcairnia oranensis L.B.Sm. – Salta in Argentina
Pitcairnia orchidifolia Mez – Venezuela
Pitcairnia oxapampae H.Luther – Peru 
Pitcairnia palaciosii Manzan. & W.Till – Ecuador
Pitcairnia pallidiflavens Rauh – Peru 
Pitcairnia palmeri S.Watson – central + western Mexico
Pitcairnia palmoides Mez & Sodiro – Colombia, Ecuador
Pitcairnia paniculata (Ruiz & Pav.) Ruiz & Pav. – Peru, Bolivia
Pitcairnia paraguayensis L.B.Sm. – Paraguay
Pitcairnia patentiflora L.B.Sm., syn. Pepinia patentiflora (L.B.Sm.) G.S.Varad. & Gilmartin – Brazil, French Guiana, Venezuela, Colombia
Pitcairnia pavonii (Mez) Mez – Ecuador 
Pitcairnia pectinata L.B.Sm., syn. Pepinia pectinata (L.B.Sm.) G.S.Varad. & Gilmartin – Antioquia of Colombia
Pitcairnia peruana (H.Luther) J.R.Grant – Peru
Pitcairnia petraea L.B.Sm. – Cundinamarca
Pitcairnia phelpsiae (L.B.Sm.) B.Holst & L.B.Sm. – State of Amazonas in Venezuela
Pitcairnia piepenbringii Rauh & E.Gross – Bahia
Pitcairnia platypetala Mez, syn. Pepinia platypetala (Mez) G.S.Varad. & Gilmartin – Brazil or Venezuela; probably extinct
Pitcairnia platystemon (Mez) Mez – Santa Cruz in Bolivia
Pitcairnia poeppigiana Mez – Peru
Pitcairnia pomacochae Rauh – Peru
Pitcairnia poortmanii André – Colombia, Ecuador
Pitcairnia prolifera Rauh – Loja in Ecuador 
Pitcairnia pruinosa Kunth, syn. Pepinia pruinosa Kunth – Colombia, Venezuela
Pitcairnia pseudopungens Rauh – Peru
Pitcairnia pseudoundulata Rauh – Peru
Pitcairnia pteropoda L.B.Sm. – Michoacán, Jalisco, Guerrero
Pitcairnia puberula Mez & Donn.Sm. – Guatemala, El Salvador, Honduras, Chiapas, Oaxaca, Guerrero
Pitcairnia pulverulenta Ruiz & Pav. – Peru
Pitcairnia pungens Kunth – Colombia, Ecuador, Peru
Pitcairnia punicea Scheidw., syn. Pepinia punicea (Scheidw.) Andrews – Guatemala, Belize, Yucatán Peninsula, Veracruz, Tabasco, Chiapas
Pitcairnia pusilla (Mez) Mez – French Guiana
Pitcairnia puyoides L.B.Sm. – Peru
Pitcairnia queroana Espejo & López-Ferr.
Pitcairnia quesnelioides L.B.Sm., syn. Pepinia quesnelioides (L.B.Sm.) G.S.Varad. & Gilmartin – Colombia, Costa Rica, Peru
Pitcairnia ramosii M.A.Spencer & L.B.Sm. – Colombia
Pitcairnia rectiflora Rauh – Peru
Pitcairnia recurvata (Scheidw.) K.Koch – Guatemala, Belize, Chiapas
Pitcairnia reflexiflora André – Ecuador
Pitcairnia rigida Mez – Colombia, Peru
Pitcairnia ringens Klotzsch – Hidalgo, Michoacán, Oaxaca, Puebla, Querétaro, San Luis Potosí, Tamaulipas, Veracruz
Pitcairnia riparia Mez – Ecuador, Peru
Pitcairnia robert-downsii Gonz.-Rocha, Espejo, López-Ferr. & Cast.-Riv.
Pitcairnia rojasii H.Luther – Amazonas Province in Peru
Pitcairnia rondonicola L.B.Sm. & Read – State of Amazonas in Brazil
Pitcairnia roseana L.B.Sm. – from Durango to Guerrero
Pitcairnia roseoalba E.Gross & Rauh – Peru
Pitcairnia rubiginosa Baker, syn. Pepinia rubiginosa (Baker) G.S.Varad. & Gilmartin – French Guiana, Guyana, Venezuela, Colombia, northern Brazil 
Pitcairnia rubronigriflora Rauh – Peru
Pitcairnia ruderalis L.B.Sm. – Ucayali
Pitcairnia ruiziana (Mez) Mez – Peru
Pitcairnia rundelliana J.R.Grant – Panama
Pitcairnia sagasteguii L.B.Sm. & Read – Peru
Pitcairnia saltensis L.B.Sm. – Salta in Argentina
Pitcairnia samuelssonii L.B.Sm. – Hispaniola
Pitcairnia sandemanii L.B.Sm. – Junín in Peru
Pitcairnia sanguinea (H.Luther) D.C.Taylor & H.Rob., syn. Pepinia sanguinea H.Luther – Colombia
Pitcairnia sastrei L.B.Sm. & Read – Amapá, French Guiana
Pitcairnia saxicola L.B.Sm. – Chiapas, Costa Rica, Panama
Pitcairnia saxosa Gouda – French Guiana
Pitcairnia scandens Ule – Peru
Pitcairnia sceptriformis Mez – Ecuador, Peru 
Pitcairnia sceptrigera Mez – Ecuador
Pitcairnia schiedeana Baker – Veracruz, Oaxaca
Pitcairnia schultzei Harms – Panama, Venezuela
Pitcairnia schunkei L.B.Sm. & Read – Peru
Pitcairnia secundiflora L.B.Sm. – Chiapas, Honduras
Pitcairnia semaphora L.B.Sm. – Colombia
Pitcairnia semijuncta Baker
Pitcairnia serrulata L.B.Sm. & Read – Peru
Pitcairnia setipetiola L.B.Sm. & Betancur – Colombia
Pitcairnia similis L.B.Sm. – Colombia
Pitcairnia simulans H.Luther – Ecuador
Pitcairnia singularis Flores-Arg., Espejo & López-Ferr.
Pitcairnia smithiorum H.Luther – Peru
Pitcairnia sneidernii L.B.Sm. – Colombia
Pitcairnia sodiroi Mez – Ecuador
Pitcairnia sordida L.B.Sm. – Guerrero
Pitcairnia spectabilis (Mez) Mez – Colombia, Ecuador
Pitcairnia spicata (Lam.) Mez – Martinique 
Pitcairnia sprucei Baker, syn. Pepinia sprucei (Baker) G.S.Varad. & Gilmartin – Venezuela, Colombia, Peru, northern Brazil, Guyana, French Guiana
Pitcairnia squarrosa L.B.Sm. – Colombia, Ecuador
Pitcairnia staminea G.Lodd. – eastern Brazil from Bahia to Rio de Janeiro
Pitcairnia stenophylla André – Colombia, Peru
Pitcairnia stevensonii H.Luther & Whitten – Pichincha
Pitcairnia steyermarkii L.B.Sm. – Falcón in Venezuela
Pitcairnia stolonifera L.B.Sm. & Read – Peru
Pitcairnia straminea (Poepp. ex Mez) Mez – Huánuco in Peru
Pitcairnia suaveolens Lindl. – Minas Gerais, Rio de Janeiro
Pitcairnia subfuscopetala Rauh & Hebding – Peru
Pitcairnia subulifera L.B.Sm. – Huánuco in Peru
Pitcairnia sulphurea Andrews – St. Vincent in Caribbean
Pitcairnia susannae Manzan. & W.Till – Ecuador
Pitcairnia sylvestris L.B.Sm. – Cauca in Colombia
Pitcairnia tabuliformis Linden – Oaxaca, Chiapas, Guatemala
Pitcairnia tarapotensis Baker – Peru
Pitcairnia tatzyanae (H.Luther) D.C.Taylor & H.Rob., syn. Pepinia tatzyanae H.Luther – Peru
Pitcairnia tillandsioides L.B.Sm. – Guerrero
Pitcairnia tillii Manzan. – Ecuador
Pitcairnia tolimensis L.B.Sm. – Colombia
Pitcairnia torresiana L.B.Sm. – Mato Grosso
Pitcairnia trianae André – Bolivia, Peru, Ecuador, Colombia 
Pitcairnia trimorpha L.B.Sm. – Colombia
Pitcairnia truncata L.B.Sm. – Peru
Pitcairnia tuberculata L.B.Sm. – Mérida in Venezuela
Pitcairnia tuerckheimii Donn.Sm. – Oaxaca, Chiapas, Guatemala
Pitcairnia tumulicola L.B.Sm. – Nariño in Colombia
Pitcairnia turbinella L.B.Sm., syn. Pepinia turbinella (L.B.Sm.) G.S.Varad. & Gilmartin – Colombia, Venezuela
Pitcairnia tympani L.B.Sm. – Mérida in Venezuela
Pitcairnia uaupensis Baker, syn. Pepinia uaupensis (Baker) G.S.Varad. & Gilmartin – Colombia, Venezuela, northern Brazil
Pitcairnia ulei L.B.Sm. – Goiás, Brasília 
Pitcairnia umbratilis L.B.Sm. – Huánuco
Pitcairnia undulata Scheidw. – Chiapas, Oaxaca, Tabasco, Veracruz
Pitcairnia unilateralis L.B.Sm. – Ecuador
Pitcairnia utcubambensis Rauh – Peru
Pitcairnia valerii Standl.
Pitcairnia vallisoletana Lex. – Jalisco, Michoacán
Pitcairnia vandersteenii Gouda
Pitcairnia vargasiana L.B.Sm. – Cusco
Pitcairnia vargasii R.Vásquez & Ibisch
Pitcairnia venezuelana L.B.Sm. & Steyerm. – Venezuela
Pitcairnia ventidirecta L.B.Sm. & Betancur – Colombia
Pitcairnia verrucosa L.B.Sm. – Colombia, Ecuador
Pitcairnia villetaensis Rauh – Colombia
Pitcairnia violascens L.B.Sm. – Ecuador
Pitcairnia virginalis Utley & Burt-Utley – Oaxaca
Pitcairnia volker-schaedlichii P.J.Braun
Pitcairnia wendlandii Baker – Chiapas, Central America
Pitcairnia wendtiae Tatagiba & B.R.Silva – Rio de Janeiro
Pitcairnia wilburiana Utley ex L.B.Sm. & Read – Guatemala
Pitcairnia wolfei L.B.Sm. – Huánuco
Pitcairnia woronowii W.Weber – Colombia
Pitcairnia xanthocalyx Mart. – Querétaro, San Luis Potosí
Pitcairnia yaupi-bajaensis Rauh – Peru
Pitcairnia yocupitziae Espejo & López-Ferr. – Guerrero

Cultivars and hybrids
 Pitcairnia albiflos × staminea
 Pitcairnia × daiseyana
 Pitcairnia 'Beaujolais'
 Pitcairnia 'Bud Curtis'
 Pitcairnia 'Chiamenez'
 Pitcairnia 'Coral Horizon'
 Pitcairnia 'Flaming Arrow'
 Pitcairnia 'Hartwig'
 Pitcairnia 'Hattie'
 Pitcairnia 'Jim Scrivner'
 Pitcairnia 'Maroni'
 Pitcairnia 'Pinot Noir'
 Pitcairnia 'Stardust'
 Pitcairnia 'Stephen Hoppin'
 Pitcairnia 'Verdia Lowe'

References

External links
 BSI Genera Gallery photos
 http://fcbs.org/pictures/Pitcairnia.htm

 
Bromeliaceae genera
Taxa named by Charles Louis L'Héritier de Brutelle